Darband-e Guyilagh (also Romanized as Darband-e Gūyīlāgh; also known as Darband) is a village in Rudshur Rural District, in the Central District of Zarandieh County, Markazi Province, Iran. At the 2006 census, its population was 16, in 4 families.

References 

Populated places in Zarandieh County